Palashbari is an upazila of Gaibandha District in the Division of Rangpur, Bangladesh.

Geography
It has 41586 households and total area 190.67 km2.

Demographics
As of the 1991 Bangladesh census, Palashbari Upazila has a population of 210806. Males constitute 50.54% of the population, and females 49.46%. This Upazila's eighteen up population is 102892. Palashbari Upazila has an average literacy rate of 26.4% (7+ years), and the national average of 32.4% literate.

Administration
Palashbari Upazila is divided into nine union parishads: Barisal, Betkapa, Harinathpur, Hossainpur, Kishoregari, Mohdipur, Monohorpur, Palashbari, and Pobnapur. The union parishads are subdivided into 161 mauzas and 160 villages.

Name of Upazila Chairman A K M Mokshed Chowdhury Biddut (2019).

Education

According to Banglapedia, Palashbari S.M. Pilot High School, founded in 1911, is a notable secondary school. Founded in 1964, Palashbari Government Collage is one of the first government co-education colleges of this region.

Notable people
TIM Fazle Rabbi Chowdhury, politician and six-time MP

See also
Upazilas of Bangladesh
Districts of Bangladesh
Divisions of Bangladesh

References

Upazilas of Gaibandha District